The University of the Republic (sometimes UdelaR) is Uruguay's oldest public university. It is by far the country's largest university, as well as the second largest public university in South America and the world's 57th largest by enrollment, with a student body of 137,757 undergraduate students in 2018 and 6,351 postgraduate students in 2012. It was founded on 18 July 1849 in Montevideo, where most of its buildings and facilities are still located. Its current rector is Rodrigo Arim.

History

The process of founding the country's public university began on 11 June 1833, when a law proposed by then-Senator Dámaso Antonio Larrañaga was passed. It called for the creation of nine academic departments; the President of the Republic would pass a decree formally creating the departments once the majority of them were in operation. In 1836 the House of General Studies was formed, housing the departments of Latin, philosophy, mathematics, theology and jurisprudence.

On 27 May 1838, Manuel Oribe passed a decree through which created the Greater University of the Republic.  That decree had few practical effects, given the institutional instability of the Oriental Republic of the Uruguay at that time.

Ranking

In 2011, according to University Ranking by Academic Performance (URAP), it is the best university in Uruguay and 858th best university in the world.

In 2015, according to QS World University Rankings, it ranks #701-750 worldwide and #38 in Latin America.

In 2018, according to QS World University Rankings, it ranks #801-1000 Worldwide, and remains in the #38 Latin American rankings.

Schools

 School of Agronomy
 School of Architecture, Design, and Urbanism
 School of Arts
 School of Chemistry
 School of Economic Science and Administration
 School of Engineering
 School of Humanities and Education Science
 University of the Republic Law School
 School of Medicine
 School of Nursing
 School of Odontology
 School of Psychology
 School of Science
 School of Social Science
 School of Veterinary Medicine
 School of Information and Communication

Law School

The University of the Republic Law School was established on June 18, 1838 as the Academy of Jurisprudence, making it the oldest law school in the nation. It became a branch of the University of the Republic on July 18, 1849. It is the only branch of the university that hasn't moved from the main building downtown Montevideo. It was the only law school in Uruguay until the arrival of the Catholic University of Uruguay in 1984.

Many Presidents of Uruguay, senators, representatives and other public authorities with a law degree have graduated from this law school. Notable professors include Jorge Gamarra, Alejandro Abal, Alberto Perez Perez, Dora Bagdassarian, Helios Sarthou, Carlos Delpiazzo, Gonzalo Fernández, and Daniel Ferrere.

The Dean is Dr. Gonzalo A. Lorenzo Idiarte.Its main executive organ is the Law School Council, integrated by the dean and members in representation of students, former students and professors.

Schools and Institutes
 School of Administration
 School of Medical Technology
 School of Nutrition and Dietetics
 School of Obstetrics
 School of Odontological Technology

Other dependencies
The university has its own hospital in Montevideo, Hospital de Clínicas “Dr. Manuel Quintela”.

Other cities
In an effort to decentralize higher education, the University has opened schools in cities other than Montevideo. Its Regional Norte in Salto offers degrees in Architecture, Law and Nursing. Fragments of other degrees, which can be completed in Montevideo, are also offered there. At the Casa Universitaria in Rivera, the Faculty of Sciences offers the Technicature in Management of Environmental Resources, which has a duration of two and a half years.

Notable alumni
 Beatriz Amendola, radiation oncologist
 Guzmán Carriquiry Lecour, Vatican official, ambassador 
 Lucrecia Covelo, entomologist
 Jana Rodriguez Hertz, mathematician
 Macarena Gelman, political activist

See also 

 List of universities in Uruguay
 Education in Uruguay

References

External links

Universidad de la República
Facultad de Agronomía (Faculty of Agronomy)
Facultad de Arquitectura (Faculty of Architecture)
Facultad de Información y Comunicación (Faculty of Information and Communication)
Facultad de Ciencias (Faculty of Sciences)
Facultad de Ciencias Económicas y de Administración (Faculty of Economic Science and Administration
Facultad de Ciencias Sociales (Faculty of Social Science)
Facultad de Derecho (Faculty of Law)
Facultad de Enfermería (Faculty of Nursing)
Facultad de Humanidades y Ciencias de la Educación (Faculty of Humanities and Education Science)
Facultad de Ingeniería (Faculty of Engineering)
Facultad de Medicina (Faculty of Medicine)
Facultad de Odontología (Faculty of Odontology)
Facultad de Psicología (Faculty of Psychology)
Facultad de Química (Faculty of Chemistry)
Facultad de Ciencias Veterinarias (Faculty of Veterinary Medicine)
Escuela de Administración (School of Administration)
Escuela de Tecnología Odontológica (School of Odontological Technology)
Escuela Universitaria de Bibliotecología y Ciencias Afines (School of Library Science and Related Sciences)
Escuela Universitaria de Música (School of Music)
Licenciatura en Ciencias de la Comunicación (Licentiateship in Communication Studies)
Instituto Escuela Nacional de Bellas Artes (National School of Fine Arts)

 
Republica
Forestry education
Educational institutions established in 1849
Government-owned companies of Uruguay
1849 establishments in Uruguay